Tina Escaja (born 1965 in Zamora, Spain), also known as Alm@ Pérez, is a Spanish-American writer, activist, feminist scholar and digital artist based in Burlington, Vermont. She is a Distinguished Professor of Romance Languages and Gender & Women's Studies, and the Director of the Gender, Sexuality and Women's Studies Program at the University of Vermont. She is the winner of the International Poetry Prize Dulce María Loynaz, and the National Latino Poetry Award for Young Adults, Isabel Campoy-Alma Flor Ada. She is considered a pioneer in the field of electronic literature in Spanish. She is a full member of the North American Academy of the Spanish Language (ANLE), and Corresponding member of the Royal Spanish Academy (RAE).

Life 
She has earned degrees from the University of Barcelona and the University of Pennsylvania. She served as President of Feministas Unidas, Inc., President of ALDEEU (Spanish Professionals in America), and President of AEGS (Association of Gender and Sexuality Studies).

Critical reception 
Her creative work has been defined as a crossover between literary writing, digital art, video and multimedia projects.

In the year 2000 she published the hypertextual poem VeloCity, considered a pioneer in the field of digital poetry in Spanish, and one of "the first hypertextual  works  written  by  women."

According to scholars and media critics María Goicoechea and Laura Sánchez, "Hypertext is, for Tina Escaja, the insignia of this new cyberfeminism that proposes a ‘non-essential modern  subject’."  The same critics note a change in this perception in Escaja's project Código de barras, a project based on barcode technology: “now technology is used to compel us to think about a perturbing reality of control and dominion.”

Media critic Maya Zalbidea sees in her interactive hypertextual novel Pinzas de metal an example of electronic Cut-up technique, and also states that "the multilinearity of the story provides the reader a feeling of intrigue and bewilderment."

Regarding her award-winning poetry collection Caída libre, the writer and critic Sabas Martín finds connections with the innovating poetry of César Vallejo, and the images created by Federico García Lorca and Gabriela Mistral.

Selected exhibitions and anthologies 
Escaja's poetry and digital works have been exhibited in museums and galleries such as the Museum Wolf Vostell Malpartida de Cáceres (Spain); Centro Cultural Okendo (San Sebastian, Spain);the BCA Center, the Flynndog Gallery, and the Art Hop in Burlington, Vermont; the Galerie du Centre de Design (Université du Québec à Montréal);Matadero Madrid, Madrid, Spain; Museo Provincial de Lugo, (Spain) the Lewis Glucksman Gallery, and the Mission District Cultural Center for Latino Arts, San Francisco.

Her work has been translated into six languages, and has been included in anthologies such as the Electronic Literature Collection, Volume 3;Escenario de crisis: dramaturgas españolas del nuevo milenio;Tasting Asia: An Anthology of Poems of the 2016 Taipei Poetry Festival;Dos Poemas y un Café: Mujeres poetas visuales II;L'altra Penelope: Antologia di scrittrici di lingua spagnola; and The WRUV Reader. A Vermont Writers’Anthology;

Poetry collections 
 La odisea marina de María Traviesa (2017) Isabel Campoy-Alma Flor Ada Award 2017. 
 Manual destructivista/Destructivist Manual (2016)  Translations by Kristin Dykstra.
 Caída libre/Free Fall (2015) Translations by Mark Eisner. Prologues by María Victoria Atencia & Li Kuei-Hsien 
 Respiración mecánica / Respiració mecànica / Hats hartze mekanikoa & VeloCity (2014) Translations by María Cinta Montagut (Catalan), Mariña Pérez Rei (Galician) and Itxaro Borda (Basque). Prologue by Marta Segarra 
 13 Lunas 13 (2011) Prologue by Jill Robbins. 
 Código de barras (2007) Prologue by Concha García & Sharon Keefe-Ugalde. 
 Caída libre (Second edition, 2007) Prologue by María Victoria Atencia. 
 Caída Libre (2004) Dulce María Loynaz Award 2004. 
 Respiración mecánica (Badosa EP, 2001)

Electronic works 

“Mar y Virus / Virus and the Sea.” Messages from the Anthropocene. Flynndog Gallery, Burlington, VT. November 2020-June 2021.
Pinzas de metal. “Afterflash: Showcasing Flash Fiction, Poetry, and Essays from The NEXT.” Collective digital exhibition curated by Dene Grigar. Electronic Literature Lab. January, 2021.
“According to your likeness / my Image.” University of Central Florida Art Gallery, Orlando, July 2020.  
 Also shown in  The Glucksman Museum. Cork, Ireland, July 11–17, 2019.

Fiction 
 Asesinato en el laboratorio de idiomas / Murder in the Language Lab  (2016) English Translation by John W. Warren. 
 "Bola luna" International Prize ‘Ana María Matute’ (finalist). (1995)

Theater 
 De tripas corazón. 2019.
 Madres, 2007.

Other works 

 Por un lenguaje inclusivo: Estudios y reflexiones sobre estrategias no sexistas en la lengua española. Co-ed with Natalia Prunes. ANLE, 2021. ISBN 978-0-999387-5-5
 Resistencia: Poems of Protest and Revolution. Co-ed with Mark Eisner. Introduction by Julia Alvarez. Tin House, 2020. ISBN 9781951142070
 Diáspora Española: Migración y exilios. Actas seleccionadas de la XXXVII Asamblea General y Congreso Internacional de ALDEEU. Co-ed with Marta Boris Tarré. Lakeville, MA: ALDEEU, 2020. ISBN Nueva York en español: Intersecciones hispánicas en EEUU. Actas seleccionadas del XXXVI
 Congreso Internacional de ALDEEU, Co-ed with Marta Boris Tarré. Lakeville, MA: ALDEEU, 2017. ISBN 978-0-692-87378-6

References

External links 
Official Website: Tina Escaja
 Biblioteca Alma Pérez
 Professor of Spanish, University of Vermont
 Faculty Feature: Robopoem@s, by Tina Escaja.
 “Proto/types”, by Kristin Dykstra.
 “Free Fall/Caída libre” Interview and podcast with Mark Eisner, by Jen Fitzgerald.
 Luis Bravo, “La navegación simultánea: escritura / lectura.”
 Interview by Jesús Hernández
 “Optics as Metaphor; The Printer at the Far End of the Romance Languages: A CyberArtist / Feminist / Impostor’s Take on Otherness.”
“Tina Escaja: una dona inquieta.”
 “Presentación de ’13 lunas 13’, de Tina Escaja”

1965 births
Living people
People from Zamora, Spain
People from Barcelona
Spanish women poets
21st-century Spanish women writers
Poets from Vermont
University of Pennsylvania alumni
University of Vermont faculty
Electronic literature writers
University of Barcelona alumni
Writers from Burlington, Vermont
21st-century American poets